George Dario Marino Franchitti  (born 19 May 1973) is a British motorsport commentator and retired motor racing driver who won the IndyCar Series Drivers' Championship four times in 2007, 2009, 2010 and 2011, the Indianapolis 500 three times in 2007, 2010 and 2012 and the 2008 24 Hours of Daytona driving for Andretti Green Racing (AGR) and later Chip Ganassi Racing (CGR).

Franchitti began karting at the age of ten and had early success before progression to car racing at age 17, winning the 1991 Formula Vauxhall Junior Championship and the 1993 Formula Vauxhall Lotus Championship. In 1995 and 1996, he competed in the Deutsche Tourenwagen Meisterschaft and the related International Touring Car Championship for the AMG-Mercedes team, winning two races. Franchitti debuted in Championship Auto Racing Teams (CART) with Hogan Racing for the 1997 season. He joined Team Green the following year and finished third in the championship with three victories. Franchitti finished second in the 1999 season after tying Juan Pablo Montoya on points and him winning four fewer races than Montoya. His form declined over the next three years, but he won four races.

Franchitti joined the renamed AGR team in the Indy Racing League in 2003, but injury limited him to only three races that year. He won two races in the 2004 and 2005 seasons, finishing fourth and sixth overall. Franchitti won his first IndyCar Drivers' Championship in 2007 with four victories, including his first Indianapolis 500 win, before joining CGR for the following year's NASCAR programme. He returned to IndyCar in 2009, winning three consecutive championships from 2009 to 2011 as well as 12 more races, including the 2010 Indianapolis 500. Franchitti's form deteriorated during the 2012 championship as he struggled to adapt to a new car, but he won his third Indianapolis 500. Following contact with Takuma Sato's car, Franchitti sustained career-ending injuries in the form of two fractured vertebrae, a broken ankle, and a concussion at the penultimate round of the 2013 season.

He competed in 265 races in American open-wheel car racing, winning 31 and finishing on the podium 92 times. After retiring, Franchitti became an advisor and driver coach for CGR, as well as a co-commentator and driver pundit on the all-electric Formula E racing series' television world feed. He has been inducted into the Long Beach Motorsports Walk of Fame, the Indianapolis Motor Speedway Hall of Fame, the Motorsports Hall of Fame of America and the Scottish Sports Hall of Fame and was named the 2007 BBC Scotland Sports Personality of the Year.

Early life and family background
Franchitti was born in Bathgate, West Lothian, Scotland on 19 May 1973. He is the son of Inverness-born Tourist Board employee Marina Franchitti, and ice cream parlour owner and amateur racing driver George Franchitti, Franchitti is of Italian descent, and all three of his Italian grandparents originate from the town of Cassino in Italy. His younger brother Marino, his cousin Paul di Resta and his godson Sebastian Melrose are also racing drivers, and he has a sister. When Franchitti was eight years old, the family moved to Whitburn from Bathgate. He was educated at Edinburgh's fee-paying Stewart's Melville College, where he did not feel at ease due to its traditionalism and teaching of cricket and rugby union to maintain physical fitness.

Junior career
When he was three years old, Franchitti received a Honda-powered go-kart. He wanted to be a racing driver ever since his father took him to the West of Scotland Kart Club and other kart tracks at a young age. When he turned ten, Franchitti started karting. His first race ended after two laps due to engine failure. He started racing at the West of Scotland Kart Club and tracks in the North of Scotland, and he tested at Knockhill near Dunfermline. At the age of 11, Franchitti won the Scottish Junior Championship in 1984 and the British Junior Karting Championships in 1985 and 1986. Franchitti retired from the 1987 Karting World Championship final after colliding with Luca Badoer. In 1988, he won the Scottish Senior Championship and was runner-up in the 1989 British Senior Karting Championship. Franchitti raced part-time in the 1990 British Senior Kart Series. Overall, he won more than 100 races and 20 karting titles.

In 1990, racing driver David Leslie's father suggested to Franchitti that he join his team and work on his cars at races. Aged 17, he began racing a single-seater vehicle for David Leslie Racing in the inaugural Formula Vauxhall Junior Championship. Franchitti's father remortgaged the family home to pay for his racing. He won the championship with four victories (three in the final three rounds) and three podium finishes. Paul Stewart Racing (PSR) offered Franchitti a Formula Vauxhall test after a team member observed him driving. If he drove for PSR, team owner Jackie Stewart promised to find funding from Scottish sponsors.. Jackie Stewart became his informal coach, teaching him how to race faster and more consistently. Franchitti finished fourth overall in the 1992 Formula Vauxhall Lotus Championship, with multiple second and third-place finishes for PSR. He won the £20,000 Autosport BRDC Award late that year, which included a test in a McLaren MP4/10B F1 car at Jerez at the end of 1995.

Franchitti became a racing school instructor the following year and earned money running circuit days for BMW and Nissan. He returned to the Formula Vauxhall Lotus Championship for PSR in a single seater Vauxhall-powered car, winning the championship at Brands Hatch in August of that year with three races remaining. Franchitti had six victories, four podium finishes and was named the series' Driver of the Year. He raced in the Silverstone round of the British Formula Three Championship that same year, finishing fifth in a PSR Reynard 933-Mugen Honda. Stewart promoted Franchitti to the British F3 Championship in 1994, hoping that he would progress to Formula One (F1) in the future, and he was expected to challenge for the title. He finished fourth overall with 133 points in a PSR Dallara F394-Mugen Honda, a single victory at Silverstone, and six top-three finishes after errors prevented him from challenging for the title, after errors prevented him from challenging for the title. Franchitti also finished 12th at the 1994 Masters of Formula 3 at Circuit Zandvoort and sixth at the 1994 Macau Grand Prix.

Touring car career

He did not have enough money to progress to Formula 3000 and did not do another season in F3 as expected because he did not want to incur more debt. Mercedes-Benz signed him just before a deadline to their junior team in their attempt to recreate their Young Driver Programme in the German-based Deutsche Tourenwagen Meisterschaft (DTM) and the related International Touring Car Championship (ITC) touring car series after their first option Giancarlo Fisichella wanted a one-year deal to retain the option of driving for Minardi in F1. He drove a Mercedes C-Class V6 equipped with an anti-lock braking system and traction control as part of the AMG-Mercedes team, Mercedes-Benz's sports car competition division.

Franchitti competed in the 1995 DTM and the 1995 ITC. His 14-race DTM season put him fifth in the Drivers' Championship with two pole positions, four podium finishes and 74 points. During the ITC season, Franchitti won his first touring car race at Mugello, twice finished second at Donington Park, and third at the second Estoril round to finish third in the Drivers' Championship with 80 points. For the 1996 ITC season, he stayed with AMG-Mercedes, finishing fourth in the Drivers' Championship with 171 points, five podium finishes, and won the first Suzuka round.

Championship Auto Racing Teams

1997–1999 
At the end of 1996, the ITC folded due to escalating costs and Franchitti told Ilmor boss Paul Morgan that he wanted to compete in the American-based Championship Auto Racing Teams (CART). After trucking mogul Carl Hogan received a letter of recommendation from Jackie Stewart and telephoned Mercedes in Germany, Franchitti was assigned to drive the  9 Reynard 97i-Mercedes-Benz car for the single Hogan Racing customer car squad by Mercedes in the 1997 CART World Series. He rejected the offer of a seven-year contract from McLaren owner Ron Dennis to test McLaren's F1 cars during the week while he competed in CART on weekends and replaced one of the team's drivers if they were injured. 

Franchitti debuted at the season-opening Grand Prix of Miami at Homestead–Miami Speedway. Starting from 13th, he crashed after running wide to allow race leader Gil de Ferran to lap him. In the following race, Franchitti achieved his best result of the season with a ninth-place finish at the Sunbelt IndyCarnival at the Surfers Paradise Street Circuit. He scored points in three more races, and the Molson Indy Toronto saw him claim his maiden CART pole position. Before the season's final race at California Speedway, Franchitti was sacked by Rogan due to their strained relationship brought on by Franchitti joining Team Green for the following season and was replaced by Robby Gordon. He was 22nd in the Drivers' Championship with 10 points and was third in the Rookie of the Year standings.

In late 1997, Franchitti signed a two-year minimum contract to drive for Team Green from the 1998 season after impressing team owner Barry Green with his abilities. He took six top-ten finishes, including a second-place finish at the Toyota Grand Prix of Long Beach, and qualified on pole position at the Rio 400, the Molson Indy Toronto and the Miller Lite 200 in the season's first 13 races. At the season's 14th race, the Texaco/Havoline 200 at Road America, Franchitti achieved his maiden series victory and the first CART triumph for a Scottish driver since Jim Clark in the 1965 Indianapolis 500. Three weeks later, he won the Molson Indy Vancouver from his fourth pole position of the season. After finishing fourth at the Honda Grand Prix of Monterey, he led every lap of the rain-shortened Texaco Grand Prix of Houston in his third and final victory of 1998. Franchitti followed up by finishing second at the Honda Indy 300 but lost the runner-up spot to Jimmy Vasser when his engine failed at the season-ending Marlboro 500 and Vasser won the race. He was third overall and scored 160 points. 

Before the 1999 season, Franchitti signed a two-year contract extension with Team Green through to the conclusion of the 2000 season since he did not want to be retained indefinitely and wanted keep his options open for future years. He was advised by his manager Craig Pollock to remain in CART to gain more experience and rejected an offer to join Stewart Grand Prix in F1. Franchitti took seven top-ten finishes in the first ten races. He led all the Molson Indy Toronto to win and took the championship lead from Juan Pablo Montoya after winning the ITT Automotive Detroit Grand Prix two races later. Over the next five rounds, Franchitti took four top ten places and pole position in the Miller Lite 200. He won the season's penultimate round, the Honda Indy 300 from pole position, to enter the season-ending Marlboro 500 nine points ahead of Montoya. Franchitti had to finish third in California to win the title but would lose on count-back if he and Montoya finished with the same number of points. He finished the race in tenth and Montoya fourth but lost the championship on tiebreak to Montoya who had won seven races to Franchitti's three.

2000–2002 
Prior to the 2000 season, Franchitti was hospitalised after a pre-season testing crash at Homestead–Miami Speedway in which part of the car's suspension hit his head, and he sustained displaced fractures in his left hip, pelvis and multiple minor brain contusions. The accident affected his mental concentration, balance, memory and fatigue levels. As a result, Franchitti underwent physical therapy five times a week, before he was declared fit to drive by CART's medical director Steve Olvey that March. His performance deteriorated due to a lack of testing, a pre-season switch of personnel, and drove an unreliable car he occasionally crashed. Franchitti's best finish of the season was second at both the Firestone Firehawk 500 at Twin Ring Motegi and the Molson Indy Vancouver. The rest of the season yielded six more top ten finishes (including third places at the Michigan 500 and the Honda Grand Prix of Monterey) and two pole positions. Franchitti was 13th in the championship with 92 points. 

He was retained by Team Green for the 2001 season after signing a contract extension with the team in August 2000. The season's opening eight rounds saw Franchitti achieve six top-ten finishes which included a second place at the Tenneco Automotive Grand Prix of Detroit. At the Marconi Grand Prix of Cleveland at Burke Lakefront Airport, he qualified 14th, passing race leader Memo Gidley with ten laps remaining for his seventh career CART victory. The rest of the season was sub-par, with four top-ten finishes and two second places at both the Harrah's 500 and the Texaco/Havoline Grand Prix of Houston. Franchitti concluded the season seventh in the championship standings with 105 points.

For the 2002 season, he returned to Team Green, signing another two-year contract extension through to the conclusion of the 2003 season in August 2001. At the season-opening Tecate/Telmex Monterrey Grand Prix, Franchitti came second and went on to claim three third places at the Bridgestone Potenza 500, the G.I. Joe's 200 and the following CART Grand Prix of Chicago (starting from pole position in Chicago). He led the final 15 laps of the Molson Indy Vancouver after teammate Paul Tracy's pit stop for fuel and tyres in his first victory of the season. Three races later, Franchitti led 43 laps to win the Molson Indy Montreal at Circuit Gilles Villeneuve starting from second. He won in the Sure for Men Rockingham 500 at Rockingham Motor Speedway in his only CART oval track victory two races later. Franchitti finished the season's final four races within the top ten to place fourth in the Drivers' Championship with 148 points.

IndyCar Series and stock car racing

2002–2004 
He made his debut in CART's rival, the Indy Racing League (IRL), in the 2002 IRL season, driving Team Green's one-off No. 27 Dallara IR02-Chevrolet Indy V8 entry for the Indianapolis 500 at Indianapolis Motor Speedway after the team located funding for the programme. Starting from 28th, Franchitti sustained a puncture after making a pit stop and was restricted to an 19th-place finish.

Although he wanted to remain a CART driver because of the series' competition and variety, he moved to the IRL for the 2003 season with the renamed Andretti Green Racing team (AGR; purchased by driver Michael Andretti, Barry Green's brother Kim Green and Kevin Savoree in 2002) following his rejection of an offer to drive for Newman/Haas Racing in place of Christian Fittipaldi. Franchitti changed his driving style to handle the lighter and more responsive normally-aspirated V8 engined car on short oval circuits, and improved his hand-eye-foot coordination. After competing in the season's first two races, finishing seventh in the season-opening round at Homestead, he sustained an anterior stable compression fracture of the lumbar vertebrae in an motorbike accident during a trip to West Lothian that April. Franchitti was replaced variously by Dan Wheldon, Gordon and Bryan Herta in the following three races. He finished a season-best fourth in the Honda Indy 225 at Pikes Peak International Raceway before requiring season-ending keyhole surgery to make his back stronger. Franchitti was replaced by Herta for the rest of the season.

He extended his contract to remain at AGR for the 2004 IndyCar Series. After crashing out of the season's opening two races at Homestead and Phoenix International Raceway, Franchitti took his first top ten finish of his campaign at Motegi. He achieved his maiden IndyCar pole position in the Bombardier 500 at the Texas Motor Speedway and finished the race in second place. Four races later, in the Menards A. J. Foyt 225 at the Milwaukee Mile, he led a race-high 111 laps to win his first IndyCar event. Franchitti went on to claim his second series victory in the Honda Indy 225 at Pikes Peak three races after that. The rest of his campaign saw him finish no higher than third at Nazareth Speedway and placed sixth in the championship standings with 409 points.

2005–2008 
Franchitti returned to drive for AGR in the 2005 championship after signing a one-year contract extension in January 2005 for a four-car team. A second-place finish at the season's seventh round, held at Richmond Raceway, was his best result over the season's opening nine rounds. Franchitti's first victory of 2005 was the Firestone Indy 200 at Nashville Superspeedway, overtaking Patrick Carpentier with seven laps remaining. The following seven rounds saw him achieve two more podium finishes with a second position at the next race at the Milwaukee Mile and a third place result at Watkins Glen International. At the season's final race at California Speedway for the Toyota Indy 400, Franchitti qualified for pole position and held off teammate Tony Kanaan for his second victory of the season. He finished fourth overall with 498 points.

At the season's conclusion, Franchitti almost declined an opportunity during negotiations to sign a one-year contract extension because he was thinking of either a career change or retirement since he had attained sub-par results in IndyCar but remained at AGR for the 2006 season. His performance declined after Team Penske and Chip Ganassi Racing (CGR) became more developed when IndyCar used only Honda engines, and AGR underperformed on short high-speed oval tracks. He took pole position for the Honda Grand Prix of St. Petersburg street course race where suspension failure after colliding with Kosuke Matsuura's damaged car eliminated him from contention. Franchitti qualified 17th for the Indianapolis 500 and came seventh after a late race pit stop for fuel. His final eight races yielded a season-best finish of second at Infineon Raceway and four top-nine finishes. Before the season-ending round at Chicagoland Speedway, Franchitti sustained a concussion in a vintage car accident at the Goodwood Revival and was replaced by A. J. Foyt IV. He was eighth in the points standings with 311 points.

For the 2007 season, Franchitti resigned to drive for AGR. He commenced the year finishing the opening four races no lower than seventh with podium finishes at Motegi and Kansas Speedway. Franchitti's season highlight was the Indianapolis 500, which he won after it was ended early after 166 laps by rain and became the race's first Scottish winner since Clark in 1965. After finishing second at the ABC Supply Company A.J. Foyt 225 to take the championship lead, he won consecutive races in the inaugural Iowa Corn Indy 250 at the Iowa Speedway and led a race-high 242 in the SunTrust Indy Challenge at Richmond from pole position. Franchitti took two pole positions at Michigan International Speedway and Infineon Raceway and four top-three finishes over the next seven races to enter the season-concluding Peak Antifreeze Indy 300 three points ahead of CGR's Scott Dixon. He won his first IndyCar championship with the race victory after Dixon's car ran out of fuel on the final lap.

Franchitti considered joining NASCAR but discussions with CGR team owner Chip Ganassi and Richard Childress Racing owner Richard Childress did not result in a race seat. Renewed talks with Ganassi saw him replace David Stremme in the No. 40 Dodge Charger on a multi-year contract from 2008 because of Stremme's sponsorship problems, and they believed that Franchitti was more marketable, a decision that greatly upset AGR. He was enrolled onto an stock car development programme entailing ARCA and the Busch Series events as well as testing. He made his stock car racing debut in the ARCA Re/Max 250 at Talladega Superspeedway, qualifying seventh and finishing 17th in the No. 42 CGR Dodge. Two weeks later, he entered one race in the Craftsman Truck Series (the Kroger 200 at Martinsville Speedway) for CGR in Cunningham Motorsports' No. 41 Dodge Ram, starting 30th and finishing 33rd after an accident.

In the 2007 Busch Series, Franchitti drove four races in CGR's No. 42 Dodge Charger, achieving a best starting position of third in the Sam's Town 250 at Memphis International Raceway and a best finish of 25th in the O'Reilly Challenge at Texas. During the 2008 NASCAR Sprint Cup Series, he entered 14 races, qualified for 10 with an average start of 28.4 and finish of 34.3 with two did not finishes. Franchitti's season-best finish was a 22nd place in the Goody's Cool Orange 500 at Martinsville and his best qualifying performance was seventh in the Lenox Industrial Tools 301 at New Hampshire Motor Speedway. He fell outside the top 35 in the points standings that he had inherited from the preceding season and was required to qualify on speed from the sixth race onwards, due to an noncompetitive car owning to his team's not mastering the Car of Tomorrow or beating other major NASCAR teams. Franchitti's Sprint Cup Series team funded by Chip Ganassi was disbanded by Ganassi and co-owner Felix Sabates in July 2008 due to the trouble of retaining major sponsorship funding.

Early in 2008, Franchitti entered the season-opening ARCA Re/Max Series race, the ARCA 200 at Daytona at Daytona International Speedway, in CGR's No. 40 Dodge, qualifying ninth and finishing tenth. He qualified CGR's No. 40 Dodge in 14 races in the renamed Nationwide Series, achieving two top-ten finishes with an average start of 12.6 and an average finish of 17.6. Franchitti's best series finish was a fifth place at the Zippo 200 at the Glen at Watkins Glen International, where he started from pole position. During the Aaron's 312 at Talladega, he sustained a minor left ankle fracture in an major accident with Larry Gunselman after his right-rear tyre failed early in the event. Franchitti was replaced by Stremme, Ken Schrader, Jeremy Mayfield, and Sterling Marlin during his recovery.

2009–2013 

He thought of returning to IndyCar while spectating the 2008 Indianapolis 500 and signed a multi-year contract with CGR to replace Wheldon from the 2009 season. Franchitti wanted to join CGR's No. 41 NASCAR Cup Series team before being reminded of the capability of IndyCars. After placing fourth in the season-opening Honda Grand Prix of St. Petersburg, he won the following Toyota Grand Prix of Long Beach after leading a race-high 51 laps. Franchitti finished no lower than seventh in the next three races and took pole position for the Bombardier Learjet 550. He won Iowa Corn Indy 250 for his second victory of 2009. Following his taking pole position for the SunTrust Indy Challenge, he led the championship after finishing second before exchanging it with teammate Dixon over the next four races. Franchitti led 45 laps of the Honda Indy Toronto from pole position to win. He took three more top six finishes before leading the entire Indy Grand Prix of Sonoma from pole position in his fourth win of 2009. Two more top-four finishes meant he was five points behind Dixon going into the season-ending Firestone Indy 300. Franchitti won the race from pole position for his second championship title, finishing the year 11 points ahead of Dixon.

He returned to CGR to defend his title in the 2010 season. At the season-opening São Paulo Indy 300, Franchitti took pole position and finished the rain-interrupted event in seventh. He was third in the Indy Grand Prix of Alabama at Barber Motorsports Park and second in the RoadRunner Turbo Indy 300 at Kansas. Franchitti qualified third for the Indianapolis 500 and led 155 laps in his second win at the event. He achieved consecutive podium finishes in both the Honda Indy Toronto and the Honda Indy Edmonton over the following five races. Franchitti won both the Honda Indy 200 at Mid-Ohio Sports Car Course and the Peak Antifreeze & Motor Oil Indy 300 at Chicagoland. A fifth at Kentucky Speedway and second at Motegi put him 12 points behind Penske's Will Power entering the season-closing Cafés do Brasil Indy 300. By finishing eighth, Franchitti won his second consecutive championship and third overall after Power's crash.

For the 2011 championship, he rejoined CGR for his second successive title defence. At the season-opening Honda Grand Prix of St. Petersburg, Franchitti started fourth and led 94 laps to win the event. He finished third in both the Indy Grand Prix of Alabama and the following Toyota Grand Prix of Long Beach before winning the first of the Firestone Twin 275s at Texas after leading 110 laps. Franchitti led 161 laps of the Milwaukee 225 from pole position in his third victory of the season and won the Honda Indy Toronto two races later. The next seven races saw him attain two second-places at Mid-Ohio and Kentucky with a third place at Edmonton and another pole position at New Hampshire. Before the season-ending IZOD IndyCar World Championship at Las Vegas Motor Speedway, Franchitti led Power in the championship standings by 18 points. The race was abandoned following a 15-car accident on the 11th lap that involved Power and caused Wheldon's death, meaning Franchitti took his fourth championship win and third in succession.

He drove for CGR for the 2012 season and initially struggled to adapt to the new Dallara DW12 car before becoming more competitive from the season's fourth event that was held in São Paulo. Franchitti took two top-ten finishes in the season's opening four rounds, placing tenth at Barber and fifth in São Paulo. His only victory of the season came at the Indianapolis 500, which he won for the third time. Franchitti was leading the race on the final lap when Rahal Letterman Lanigan Racing driver Takuma Sato crashed into the barrier in an unsuccessful attempt to overtake Franchitti on the inside into turn one. The rest of the season was sub-par with four pole positions that did not result in a race victory and three more podium finishes. Franchitti was seventh in the Drivers' Championship with 363 points.

He remained at CGR for the 2013 championship. After finishing 25th in both of the season's first two races due to an accident in St. Petersburg and mechanical failure at Barber respectively, Franchitti qualified on pole position for the Toyota Grand Prix of Long Beach, where he finished fourth. He achieved another ten top-ten finishes and took pole position three more times during the remaining fifteen events he participated with a season-best finish of third at each of the Pocono IndyCar 400, the first Honda Indy Toronto race, the Honda Indy 200 at Mid-Ohio and the GoPro Indy Grand Prix of Sonoma. Franchitti placed tenth in the final championship standings with 418 points.

Career-ending accident and mentoring 
On the final lap of the second race of the 2013 Shell-Pennzoil Grand Prix of Houston doubleheader on October 6, he collided with the rear of Sato's loose car in turn five and was launched into the catchfence. ripped apart a fence section and sent debris into the grandstand past a second fence ahead of spectators before ricocheting back onto the circuit, spinning multiple times and coming to a stop, Franchitti was on the racing surface, driver's side-up, with the car's front removed but the chassis' tub portion intact. When E. J. Viso arrived at the crash site, he hit Sato's stationary wrecked car. A recovery crew assisted Sato and Viso as they safely evacuated their cars. An IndyCar official and 13 spectators were injured; two fans were hospitalised and eleven received on-site treatment.

Franchitti was sent to Memorial Hermann–Texas Medical Center for surgery to stabilise a fractured right ankle after suffering a concussion, two spine fractures. On 10 October, he was released from the Houston hospital, and travelled to Indianapolis for surgery to repair the right talus bone connecting the leg and the foot. On October 18, Franchitti was released from the Indianapolis hospital. After seeing a doctor in Miami for neurological examinations and an MRI that produced negative results, he travelled to Scotland in November for rest and mental clarity. Doctors advised him that his injuries, as well as those from previous accidents, put him at risk of permanent paralysis and brain damage in another major crash, so he retired from competitive driving. Franchitti's memory, decision-making, and concentration levels have suffered because of the crash.

He has worked for CGR as an advisor and driver coach to each of the team's racers since the 2014 IndyCar Series, on a plan devised by him and Ganassi, with a particular focus on coaching and mentoring young drivers. Franchitti provides performance advice to CGR's racers and engineers. He did not want to be a team owner as he believed the financial risks that owners took were too great.

Other racing ventures
He cancelled a planned entry to the 1999 Rally GB held that November due to a scheduling conflict. In July 2000, Franchitti took part in a two-day test session for the Jaguar F1 team in its R1 car at Silverstone. He made his endurance racing debut at the 2005 24 Hours of Daytona of the Rolex Sports Car Series, sharing Howard-Boss Motorsports's No. 2 Pontiac Crawford DP03 entry with Milka Duno, Marino Franchitti and Wheldon. They finished 16th in the Daytona Prototype class and 33rd overall after Duno crashed with less than six hours left. In 2006, Franchitti again entered the 24 Hours of Daytona, this time with CITGO Racing/SAMAX Motorsport in its No. 7 Riley MkXI DP-Pontiac alongside Duno, Marino Franchitti and Kevin McGarrity, finishing eighth overall after mechanical trouble. He, Herta and Kanaan won the Le Mans Prototype 2 (LMP2) category at the 2007 12 Hours of Sebring (part of the American Le Mans Series) and finished second overall in AGR's No. 26 Acura ARX-01 car. Franchitti and Herta then came sixth in the Toyota Grand Prix of Long Beach.

He won the 2008 24 Hours of Daytona with Montoya, Scott Pruett and Memo Rojas, completing 695 laps in the No. 01 Chip Ganassi Racing with Felix Sabates (CGRFS) Riley-Lexus car. Franchitti partnered David Brabham and Scott Sharp in Highcroft Racing's No. 9 Acura ARX-01B LMP2 entry at the 2008 Petit Le Mans, retiring after 16 laps when Sharp crashed the car. In 2009, he, Alex Lloyd and Dixon finished the 24 Hours of Daytona fifth in CGRFS' No. 02 Riley-Lexus vehicle. Franchitti also raced alongside Brabham and Sharp at Highcroft Racing, sharing the No. 9 Acura ARX-02a Le Mans Prototype 1 (LMP1) car for both the 12 Hours of Sebring and the Petit Le Mans, retiring with transmission failure at Sebring and finishing sixth at Road Atlanta. He entered the 2010 24 Hours of Daytona alongside Dixon, Jamie McMurray and Montoya at CGRFS in a Riley MkXX-BMW vehicle in 2010, finishing 37th due to mechanical failure.

Franchitti joined Dick Johnson Racing as Steven Johnson's international co-driver in its No. 17 Ford FG Falcon for the 2010 Armor All Gold Coast 600 double header event of the V8 Supercar Championship Series, finishing the first race 16th and Johnson crashed in the second. He returned to the 24 Hours of Daytona in both 2011 and 2012 alongside Dixon, McMurray and Montoya at CGRFS, coming second and fourth respectively in the No. 2 Riley-BMW entry. For the 2012 Petit Le Mans, Franchitti joined Marino Franchitti and Scott Tucker as a co-driver of Level 5 Motorsports's No. 055 HPD ARX-03b-Honda LMP2 car, placing third overall and second in category. At the 2013 24 Hours of Daytona, he, Dixon, Joey Hand and McMurray were 37th overall after McMurray crashed the No. 2 car after a pit stop but he and Dixon came third in the Continental Tire Sports Car Festival.

Plans for Franchitti to drive a Porsche 919 Hybrid LMP1 vehicle at the 2015 24 Hours of Le Mans upon retiring from IndyCar after 2014 that were initiated by Red Bull Racing driver Mark Webber and to race in the all-electric Formula E series failed to come to fruition due to his career-ending injuries in Houston in 2013. Although he conducted car demonstrations because he could not compete in any form of racing since he had to be careful to not sustain another injury, doctors and Motorsport UK medically cleared him to enter amateur classic car events from 2019.

Non-racing ventures and personal life

Since 2010, he has endorsed the Dutch TW Steel watch brand. Franchitti volunteered for the Bethany Christian Trust charity in Edinburgh as a van driver delivering food and drink to the homeless, and the Mission Motorsport charity supporting the rehabilitation and employment of former military personnel, frequently through sport. He appeared on the Late Show with David Letterman and The Late Late Show with Craig Ferguson three times each in the late 2000s and early 2010s. 

Franchitti made a cameo appearance as a racing driver in the 2001 film Driven. He also voiced a Scottish news anchor and a male tourist in the 2013 animated film Turbo, for which he provided technical consultation. He has served as a television co-commentator and driver pundit on Formula E's world feed since its inaugural season in 2014. In 2019, Franchitti and Take That band member Howard Donald co-presented the four-part Channel 4 television motoring series Mission Ignition. He has worked in development for Acura and Gordon Murray Automotive, two high-performance car manufacturers. 

He is a member of the "Brat Pack", an international group of CART drivers composed of Kanaan, Greg Moore, and Max Papis who shared an energetic desire for enjoyment, attending all-night parties, discussing life, and staying in close contact with one another. Moore introduced Franchitti to actress Ashley Judd at Jason Priestley's wedding in February 1999. They were engaged that same year and married on 12 December 2001 at Skibo Castle close to Dornoch, Scotland. There were no children in the marriage. Franchitti and Judd were divorced in 2013; both remain on friendly terms. He has since remarried to hedge fund executive Eleanor Robb. They have two children.

Awards and recognition 
Franchitti received the Autosport British Club Driver of the Year in 1993 and the Autosport British Competition Driver of the Year in both 1998 and 2010. In 2001, he earned the Greg Moore Legacy Award as "the driver who best typifies Moore's legacy of outstanding talent on track as well as displaying a dynamic personality with fans, media and within the CART community." Six years later, Franchitti received the BBC Scotland Sports Personality of the Year, the Gregor Grant Award, the Jackie Stewart Medal and the Callands Trophy. 

He was one of two winners of the BRDC Gold Star in 2009. A 2010 photographic portrait of Franchitti taken by David Livshin has been held by the Scottish National Gallery since 2011. He was appointed Member of the Order of the British Empire (MBE) in the 2014 Birthday Honours "for services to motor racing". Franchitti was elected to the Long Beach Motorsports Walk of Fame in 2014, the Indianapolis Motor Speedway Hall of Fame in 2017, the Open Wheel category of the Motorsports Hall of Fame of America in 2019 and the Scottish Sports Hall of Fame in 2022.

Motorsports career results

Touring car racing

Deutsche Tourenwagen Meisterschaft
(key) (Races in bold indicate pole position) (Races in italics indicate fastest lap)

International Touring Car Championship
(key) (Races in bold indicate pole position) (Races in italics indicate fastest lap)

† – Retired, but was classified as he completed 90% of the winner's race distance.

International V8 Supercar results
(key) (Races in bold indicate pole position) (Races in italics indicate fastest lap)

American open–wheel racing results
(key)

CART

* Franchitti lost the title on the tiebreaker—he won only three races compared to Juan Pablo Montoya's seven after both tied on 212 points.

IndyCar Series

 ** Podium (Non-win) indicates second or third place finishes.
 *** Top 10s (Non-podium) indicates fourth through tenth place finishes.

Indianapolis 500

 1 Non-points-paying, exhibition race.
 2 Cancelled due to death of Dan Wheldon.
 ''3 Sat out of race due to injury

Sports car racing

American Le Mans Series results
(key) (Races in bold indicate pole position, Results are overall/class)

Rolex Sports Car Series results
(key) (Races in bold indicate pole position, Results are overall/class)

NASCAR
(key) (Bold – Pole position awarded by qualifying time. Italics – Pole position earned by points standings or practice time. * – Most laps led.)

Sprint Cup Series

Daytona 500

Nationwide Series

Craftsman Truck Series

ARCA Racing Series
(key) (Bold – Pole position awarded by qualifying time. Italics – Pole position earned by points standings or practice time. * – Most laps led.)

Notes

References

Bibliography

External links

 

 
 

Living people
1973 births
People from Bathgate
Sportspeople from West Lothian
Scottish racing drivers
Scottish expatriate sportspeople in the United States
24 Hours of Daytona drivers
Indianapolis 500 drivers
Indianapolis 500 winners
IndyCar Series champions
IndyCar Series drivers
Champ Car drivers
British Formula Three Championship drivers
American Le Mans Series drivers
NASCAR drivers
Supercars Championship drivers
Deutsche Tourenwagen Masters drivers
ARCA Menards Series drivers
BRDC Gold Star winners
Members of the Order of the British Empire
People educated at Stewart's Melville College
Italian Scottish racing drivers
Rolex Sports Car Series drivers
British people of Italian descent
Scottish people of Italian descent
Andretti Autosport drivers
Chip Ganassi Racing drivers
Mercedes-AMG Motorsport drivers
Highcroft Racing drivers
Hogan Racing drivers
Paul Stewart Racing drivers
Level 5 Motorsports drivers
Dick Johnson Racing drivers